Katheryn "Kathy" Patricia Alexandria Lloyd (born 13 November 1967) is a Northern Irish former Page 3 girl, glamour model and television presenter.

Biography

Kathy Lloyd was born in Carrickfergus, Northern Ireland and grew up in Netherton, Bootle where she attended Warwick Bolam High School.

Lloyd left school at 16 and worked at the Top Shop clothing store in Liverpool before venturing into modelling. Some of her early photos were taken by Beverley Goodway, a famous UK glamour photographer who persuaded her to send some photos to  The Sun. She first appeared as a Page 3 girl in The Sun in early 1986, at the age of 18, where she quickly became a regular and voted page 3 girl of the year three times in 1986, 1990 and 1994.

Later she appeared in "Lads' magazines" such as Maxim, Loaded, and FHM; and hosted two television talk shows for Granada Television's Men & Motors satellite station in 2002, Talking Dirty, and Kathy Lloyd's Naughty Business.

She was listed in the FHM 100 Sexiest Women in the World 2005.

Television appearances

Lloyd appeared on TV shows such as The Word in 1990 and 1994, a Gotcha on Noel's House Party in 1992, a guest on Shooting Stars, Celebrity Squares in 1995 and TFI Friday in 1996.

References

External links
Kathy Lloyd Biography on TV.com

1967 births
Living people
Page 3 girls